Akaki Ionovich Beliashvili (1903/1904-1961) was a Soviet writer of Georgian origin. He was said to be born in Chiatura (alternatively, Koreti) and studied at the gymnasium in Kutaisi. In 1921 he moved to Tbilisi and entered the mining faculty of the Transcaucasian Polytechnic Institute. Actively writing since school days, he published short stories and, in the forties, the historical novel Besiki about the life and times of the 18th century poet and politician Besiki Gabashvili. Other novels include The Golden Tent, Pereval, Rustavi and Shvidkatsi.

He died in a car accident in December 1961.

His work has been translated into Russian; one of his stories also appeared in a Bengali-language anthology of Soviet short stories.

References

Soviet writers
1900s births
1961 deaths
Year of birth uncertain
Burials at Didube Pantheon